Pabbay is one of the Barra Isles at the southern tip of the Outer Hebrides of Scotland. The name comes from Papey, which is Norse for "island of the papar" (i.e. monks). At only , it never had a large population, and, after all the able-bodied men were killed in a fierce storm while out on a fishing trip on 1 May 1897, it was abandoned in the early twentieth century.

The National Trust for Scotland has owned the island since 2000. With only two sheep left on the island in July 2007 and few, if any, other permanent mammalian residents, Pabbay is consequently home in summer to many ground-nesting birds due to the absence of predators.

The island was the site of a Celtic hermitage, and a Pictish carved stone dates from that period. Remains of an Iron Age settlement can also been seen on Pabbay.

The name of Pabbay is used for one of the three houses of Castlebay Secondary School. The other two are Mingulay and Sandray.

Areas of Interest

Bàgh Bàn is the name applied to a large bay situated on the SE coast of the island. It's the principal bay on the coast of the island and is well sheltered from the North and West - this made it the ideal area for historical settlers.

Rosinish  (or Rubha Phabach) is a small peninsular headland situated on the East coast of the island. It lies in a South-Easterly direction and is only attached to the mainland of the island by a small natural arch.

Steir is the narrow rock which joins Rosinish to the mainland.

Rock Climbing
Composed of Lewisian gneiss, Pabbay is "one of the finest climbing venues in the UK".
This includes the climbing route The Great Arch, which is graded E8 6c.

See also

 List of islands of Scotland

Footnotes

External links
Scottish climbers blog
topo guide

Barra Isles
National Trust for Scotland properties
Uninhabited islands of the Outer Hebrides
Former populated places in Scotland
Natural arches of Scotland